Torsten Hjalmar Lord (2 March 1904 – 4 February 1970) was a Swedish sailor who competed at the 1936, 1948 and 1952 Summer Olympics. In 1936 he won the bronze medal as crew member of the Swedish boat May Be in the 6 metre class. Twelve years later he won his second bronze medal. This time as crew member of the Swedish boat Ali Baba II in the 6 metre class. In 1952 he finished fourth as a crew member of the Swedish boat May Be II in the 6 metre class event.

References

External links
 
 
 
 

1904 births
1970 deaths
Swedish male sailors (sport)
Olympic sailors of Sweden
Olympic bronze medalists for Sweden
Olympic medalists in sailing
Sailors at the 1936 Summer Olympics – 6 Metre
Sailors at the 1948 Summer Olympics – 6 Metre
Sailors at the 1952 Summer Olympics – 6 Metre
Medalists at the 1948 Summer Olympics
Medalists at the 1936 Summer Olympics
Royal Swedish Yacht Club sailors
People from Nacka Municipality
Sportspeople from Stockholm County